is a 1993 action adventure game by Bandai for the Game Boy. It was released exclusively in Japan. The game is notable for featuring nearly every monster in the Godzilla franchise up until the time of its release.

Story
While the game does not feature a distinguishable story, the basic premise is that hundreds of monsters have arisen all over Japan and Godzilla is the only one who can defeat all of them. Human armies will attempt to slow down Godzilla and the other monsters' rampage. The game ends with a final battle between Godzilla and Super MechaGodzilla, with Godzilla emerging as the victor and retaining his title as the King of the Monsters.

Gameplay

The game is a 2D side-scroller, with Godzilla being the only playable character. Godzilla can use a wide variety of attacks, including a punch, a kick, and a tail whip. He can also use his signature atomic breath, which can be fired up, down, or straight. Using the aforementioned attack drains him of his health. If Godzilla stops moving, his health gradually gets restored. Buildings on the background can sometimes be interacted with, and if destroyed, will sometimes refill Godzilla's health quickly. 

The game does not feature a save system, and it only allows the player to continue for three times if they are killed. There are five levels, with each level containing a final boss monster that Godzilla needs to defeat before he is able to progress further into the game. 

Aside from monsters, various human vehicles such as warships, gunships, fighter jets, and tanks also serve as enemies in the game. However, they do not deal significant damage to Godzilla and can be destroyed easily.

Bosses

Below is a list of the boss monsters in the game, in the order by which they appear. 

Level 1: Osaka 

Ebirah
Battra Larva (Ocean)
Mothra Larva
Battra Larva
Battra Imago

Mothra Imago

Level 2: Lake Ashino

Super-X
Anguirus
Biollante (Rose Form)
Super-X2

Biollante 

Level 3 : Mt. Fuji

Hedorah (Flying Form)
Manda
Gabara
Kamacuras
Kumonga

Hedorah

Level 4 : Nagoya

King Ghidorah
King Caesar
Gigan
Jet Jaguar
Megalon
Gezora
Ganimes
Gorosaurus

Mecha-King Ghidorah 

Level 5 : Tokyo

Mechagodzilla (Flying)
Fake Godzilla
Mechagodzilla
Varan
Titanosaurus
Rodan

Super Mechagodzilla

See also
 List of Godzilla video games

References

External links
http://www.giantbomb.com/kaiju-oh-godzilla/61-22868
http://tohokingdom.com/vg/kotmg/specs.htm
http://gameboy.ign.com/objects/142/14245419.html

1993 video games
Bandai games
Game Boy-only games
Godzilla games
Japan-exclusive video games
Game Boy games
Video games developed in Japan
Single-player video games
Action video games